The 2007 World Interuniversity Games were the ninth edition of the Games (organised by IFIUS), and were held in Vienna, Austria, from October 1 to October 5, 2007.

Hosting
Vienna was selected as host city for the Games. The host university was Vienna University of Technology (TU Wien).

Competitions
Teams participated in 6 different competitions (4 sports), the same as in Dublin 2006.

 Football Men
 Football Women
 Futsal Men
 Basketball Men
 Volleyball Men
 Volleyball Women

Final standings

Football Men

Football Women

Futsal Men

Basketball Men

Volleyball Men

Volleyball Women

External links
 Results Vienna 2007

World Interuniversity Games
World Interuniversity Games
World Interuniversity Games
International sports competitions hosted by Austria
Multi-sport events in Austria
Sports competitions in Vienna
October 2007 sports events in Europe
2000s in Vienna